Student protests in Croatia 2009 began at the Faculty of Humanities and Social Sciences at the University of Zagreb. On Monday, 20 April 2009, the independent students' initiative for the right to free education started an occupation of the Faculty of Philosophy in Zagreb, Croatia. The occupation lasted for 35 days, until 24 May, when the students voted to suspend the occupation. The students were protesting the Croatian government's plans to reduce public funding for higher education.

The occupation in Zagreb spread next day to the University of Zadar (where the entire university was blocked) and then to other cities in the country, including Split, Pula, Rijeka and Osijek. During those 35 days, around 20 faculties and universities in eight Croatian cities were occupied at some point.

The students who organized the occupation demanded the right to free education for all and the elimination of all tuition fees, at all levels of higher education: undergraduate, graduate and postgraduate. During the occupation, everyone was free to enter and leave the faculty buildings, but regular classes were not held. Instead, students organized an alternative educational program, which consisted of lectures, public discussions, workshops, movie screenings and other events. Everyone was free to attend these happenings, whether they were students or not. Only the regular classes were blocked – the administration, the library, the bookshop and other facilities within the faculty building were allowed to function as usual.

The central organ of student decision making at the occupied faculty called plenum was set up. All decisions were made in a direct democratic manner, including whether the student occupation of the faculty should be continued or ended. The plenum was an assembly of all interested students and other citizens and everyone had the right to speak and vote. All decisions were made by the majority of all present participants.

The initial occupation in Zagreb ended soon after the university administration announced that sanctions would be imposed if the action were not ended.

On 23 November the students again occupied the Faculty of Humanities and Social Sciences in Zagreb. After nearly two weeks, the plenum, voted to end the occupation on 4 December.

They have received letters of support from individuals and organizations, both from Croatia and from abroad. Among those who have expressed support for their cause were Noam Chomsky, Judith Butler and Slavoj Žižek.

The students of Faculty of Humanities and Social Sciences in Zagreb wrote a manual called The Occupation Cookbook in which they described the functioning of their faculty during the occupation.

References

External links
 Free Faculty of Humanities and Social Sciences: website of the student organization.

Protests in Croatia
Student Protests In Croatia, 2009
Education in Croatia
Student protests in Europe
Student protests in Croatia
Student strikes